The Leman Pro-Am was a golf tournament on the Challenge Tour, held 1990–1993 at Lac Leman, either in Switzerland or France (1991).

Winners

References

External links
Coverage on the Challenge Tour's official site

Former Challenge Tour events
Golf tournaments in Switzerland
Defunct golf tournaments in France
Recurring sporting events established in 1990
Recurring sporting events disestablished in 1993